

Review and events

Matches

Legend

Friendly matches

Preseason

Midseason

Winter break

Super League

Kickoff times are in CET

League results and fixtures
First half of season

Second half of season

League table

Swiss Cup

Kickoff times are in CET

Squad

Squad, matches played and goals scored

Last updated: 2 August 2015 

Note: Numbers in parenthesis denotes substitution appearances.

Players in italic left the club during the season

Transfers

Coaching staff

Sources

Grasshopper Club Zurich
Grasshopper Club Zürich seasons